Victim of Desire, also known as Implicated, is a 1995 American erotic thriller film directed by Jim Wynorski and starring Marc Singer and Shannon Tweed.

Wynorski who said it was one of the few films in his career he regretted making (the other being Vampirella.) He says he was asked to do the project by the producer Andrew Stevens who was a friend. Wynorski had trouble making sense of the script, as did Stevens, but was told to film it anyway.

Cast
Marc Singer as Peter Starky
Shannon Tweed as Carla Duvall
Julie Strain as Linda Hammond
Johnny Williams as Marv Riker
Wings Hauser as Leland Duvall
Burton Gilliam as Lynch

References

External links

1995 films
Films directed by Jim Wynorski
American erotic thriller films
1990s erotic thriller films
1990s English-language films
1990s American films